Riceville is an unincorporated community in Johnson County, Kentucky, United States. The community's first post office was established on October 17, 1891, and may have been named after local resident, Sherman Rice. A few years later, the community began to flourish after the Big Sandy & Kentucky River Railroad was extended into the community and a lumber mill was established. Riceville's ZIP code is 41252.

References

Unincorporated communities in Johnson County, Kentucky
Unincorporated communities in Kentucky
Coal towns in Kentucky